Carlos Cortez (August 13, 1923 – January 19, 2005) was a poet, graphic artist, photographer, muralist and political activist, active for six decades in the Industrial Workers of the World.

Born in Milwaukee, Wisconsin in 1923, the son of a Mexican Wobbly union organizer father and a German socialist pacifist mother, Cortez spent 18 months in a US prison as a conscientious objector during the World War II, refusing to "shoot at fellow draftees."

Cortez joined the Industrial Workers of the World in 1947, identifying himself as an anarcho-syndicalist, writing articles and drawing cartoons for the union newspaper the Industrial Worker for several decades.

As an accomplished artist and a highly influential political artist, Cortez is perhaps best known for his wood and linoleum-cut graphics.  His work is represented in the collections of several museums around the world, including the Museum of Modern Art in New York. The National Museum of Mexican Art in Chicago holds the largest, most complete collection of Carlos Cortez's work. In 2002, Cortez edited and introduced the book Viva Posada: A Salute to the Great Printmaker of the Mexican Revolution.

Quotation
 "When you do a painting that's it, it's one of a kind. But when you do a graphic the amount of prints you can make from it is infinite. I made a provision in my estate, for whoever will take care of my blocks, that if any of my graphic works are selling for high prices immediate copies should be made to keep the price down."

References
Politicalgraphics.org

External links
Cortez obituary on Rebel Graphics
Carlos Cortez biography
Carlos Cortez memorial at Polvo

1923 births
2005 deaths
American conscientious objectors
Anarcho-syndicalists
Industrial Workers of the World members
American artists of Mexican descent
Artists from Chicago
Mestizo photographers
Mestizo painters
20th-century American painters
American male painters
Anti–World War II activists
Writers from Chicago